Satish Khanna (born 8 November 1928) is an Indian former cricketer. He played first-class cricket for Bengal and Delhi.

See also
 List of Bengal cricketers
 List of Delhi cricketers

References

External links
 

1928 births
Living people
Indian cricketers
Bengal cricketers
Delhi cricketers
Cricketers from Lahore